Lyd may refer to:
 LYD, the abbreviation for a Libyan dinar
 PKP class Lyd2, a diesel hydraulic locomotive
 Lyd (locomotive), a 2010-built narrow-gauge steam locomotive based on a design for the Lynton and Barnstaple Railway
 River Lyd (disambiguation), the name of two rivers in England
 A common diminutive of Lydia